In mathematics, in the realm of abelian group theory, a group is said to be algebraically compact if it is a direct summand of every abelian group containing it as a pure subgroup.

Equivalent characterizations of algebraic compactness:
 The reduced part of the group is Hausdorff and complete in the  adic topology.
 The group is pure injective, that is, injective with respect to exact sequences where the embedding is as a pure subgroup.

Relations with other properties:
 A torsion-free group is cotorsion if and only if it is algebraically compact.
 Every injective group is algebraically compact.
 Ulm factors of cotorsion groups are algebraically compact.

External links
 On endomorphism rings of Abelian groups
Abelian group theory
Properties of groups